Frank Harris Patterson (1890 — 1976) was a Nova Scotian lawyer, jurist and historian.

Born in Tatamagouche, Nova Scotia, Patterson was called to the Bar of Nova Scotia in 1921.  In 1958 he was appointed to the Supreme Court bench, retiring in 1965. A well-known Nova Scotia historian, Patterson wrote many books and articles, including A History of Tatamagouche and Acadian Tatamagouche and Fort Franklin. He lived most of his life in Truro, Nova Scotia, and died there in 1976.

External links
 

1890 births
1976 deaths
Canadian male non-fiction writers
Canadian people of British descent
Judges in Nova Scotia
Lawyers in Nova Scotia
People from Colchester County
20th-century Canadian historians